Priya Jhingan is an Indian Army officer and Lady Cadet No 1 and Silver Medalist from the first batch of 25 lady officers who were commissioned in the Indian Army in 1993.

Army career
Being the daughter of a police officer, Priya initially wanted to join the Indian Police Service but decided to write to the then Chief of Army Staff General Sunith Francis Rodrigues to allow her to join the army. Her request was accepted in 1992 for training at the Officers Training Academy in Chennai. She started her military training from 21 September 1992 along with 24 other lady cadets. She graduated as the Silver Medallist of the First Women's Course on  06 March 1993  Her request to join an infantry battalion was rejected by the army as there were no such provisions for the same . Also being a law graduate, she joined Corps of  Judge Advocate General. After ten years of distinguished service at Judge Advocate General Department where she conducted numerous Court Martial , Major Priya was released in 2003 as per the contract of service  Major. Priya has always been a strong advocate for women being given equal roles as men in the Indian Army . She defended the women in Indian Army as a right over the controversial suicide of Lieutenant Sushmita Chakravarty in which the then Vice-Chief of Army Staff,  Lt Gen S Pattabhiraman had to apologize for an insensitive remark about women in the army. Post release from the Indian Army , she always advocated permanent commission and giving command of units to women officers in Indian Army. Her views were published in The Times of India on 17 Feb 2020 and taken note of by decision makers. The Supreme Court of India passed a ruling granting equal opportunities to women to command units in the Indian Army in February 2020, 17 years after she was released from the Army.

Life after release from Army 
After retirement, Major Priya cleared the Haryana Judicial Services but decided against joining the Judicial Service. She then completed a Bachelor's in Journalism and Mass Communication and took up editing a weekly, Sikkim Express, in Gangtok. In 2013, she was one of the participants of Khatron Ke Khiladi Season 1. In 2013 she joined Lawrence School, Sanawar as an English teacher and a House Mistress. Priya Jhingan is married to Lieutenant Colonel Manoj Malhotra who runs an adventure sports company named Pep Turf . The couple live in Chandigarh, India and have one son, Aryaman.
In August 2020, she along with seven female students and a female teacher of The Lawrence School scaled Mount Kilimanjaro —the highest mountain in Africa, with its summit about 4,900 metre (16,100 ft) from its base, and 5,895 metre (19,341 ft) above sea level.

In Feb 2018 , Major Priya Jhingan was felicitated by the President of India , Shri Ram Nath Kovind, for being the pioneer of women in  the Indian Army amongst 112 other prominent women in various fields in India.

References

Indian Army officers
Indian women in war
Living people
Year of birth missing (living people)